Sawpan Kumar Das is a retired Bangladeshi football player and coach. He captained the Bangladesh national football team once during his international career.

Club career
Swapan Das started playing for Police Football Club in 1976 in the Dhaka League. He then went on to play for Wari Club and Wanderers Club before joining Mohammedan SC in 1980. In 1984, Sawpan captained Mohammedan, however the following year he switched clubs, joining Brothers Union. In his debut season with "The Oranges", they finished league runners-up. Sawpan retired in 1988 after returning to Mohammedan and finished his career with his second and final Dhaka League title.

International career
In 1978, Sawpan got selected for the Bangladesh U20 team by German coach Werner Bickelhaupt, for the 1978 AFC Youth Championship held in Dhaka. His performance during the tournament convinced Bickelhaupt to give him a place in the senior national team squad, for the 1978 Asian Games. Sawpan went on to represent his country during the 1979 President's Cup in Korea, and the 1980 AFC Asian Cup qualifiers, in Dhaka. However, coach Abdur Rahim did not include him in the squad for the 1980 AFC Asian Cup. In 1981, Sawpan was part of the Under–20 team that took part in the 1980 AFC Youth Championship. During the tournament he was an integral part of the team, helping Bangladesh earn draws against both South Korea and Qatar. Nonetheless, the team disappointed during the other two games, and were unable to advance past the group-stage.

In 1982, Sawpan returned to the senior team under coach Mohammad Kaikobad, he was a member of a disappointing Bangladesh team which took part in the Quaid-e-Azam International Cup, in Pakistan. Nonetheless, during the 1982 Asian Games, Swapan was part of the team which made history by defeating Malaysia 2–1. He was made the captain of the Bangladesh Green team (B team) at the 1983 President's Gold Cup in Dhaka. He represented Bangladesh in the Bangladesh President's Gold Cup in 1981, 1982 and 1983. In 1983, Sawpan played his first Merdeka Cup. During his last two years representing Bangladesh, Sawpan played the 1984 AFC Asian Cup qualifiers and 1986 FIFA World Cup qualifiers. His last international tournament was the 1985 edition of Pakistan's Quaid-e-Azam Tournament, during which he captained the team.

Honours
Mohammedan SC
 Dhaka League = 1980, 1982
 Federation Cup = 1980*, 1981, 1982*, 1983
 DMFA Cup = 1984
 Ashis-Jabbar Shield Tournament (India) = 1982

References

Living people
1962 births
Bangladeshi footballers
Bangladesh international footballers
Bangladesh youth international footballers
Association football defenders
Bangladeshi Hindus
Brothers Union players
Bangladesh Police FC players
Mohammedan SC (Dhaka) players
People from Munshiganj District
Bangladeshi football managers
Bangladesh Football Premier League managers
Asian Games competitors for Bangladesh
Footballers at the 1978 Asian Games
Footballers at the 1982 Asian Games